Nowy Folwark  is a settlement in the administrative district of Gmina Szamotuły, within Szamotuły County, Greater Poland Voivodeship, in west-central Poland.

References

Villages in Szamotuły County